Anthony Parks (born 28 January 1963) is an English football coach and former professional footballer who played as a goalkeeper. In a career spanning over 20 years, he was on the books of 15 different clubs, making more than 250 league appearances and won the 1983–84 UEFA Cup with Tottenham Hotspur. After retiring as a player he had two spells as joint caretaker manager of Halifax Town.

Career
Parks was born in Hackney, London, and began his football career with Tottenham Hotspur. Though never a first-team regular, he was on the winning side in the 1984 UEFA Cup Final, in which he saved the final penalty from Anderlecht's Arnór Guðjohnsen in the penalty shootout. While still at Tottenham he had loan spells at fellow First Division club Oxford United and third-tier Gillingham.

Following his departure from Spurs in 1988 he signed for Third Division side Brentford, for whom he played 71 league games. In the 1990–91 season he was loaned to Queens Park Rangers in the First Division and subsequently joined third-tier side Fulham. Spells at West Ham United and Stoke City followed before he started a four-season spell at Scottish side Falkirk. After leaving them in 1996, his career concluded with spells at Blackpool, Burnley, Doncaster Rovers, Barrow, Scarborough and Halifax Town.

After his playing career ended, Parks went on to work as a goalkeeping coach. He held roles at several clubs and also worked with the England youth teams for the Football Association. In November 2008, he returned to Tottenham, succeeding Hans Leitert as goalkeeping coach.

In June 2016, Parks was released from his position of goalkeeping coach by Aston Villa. Prior to the 2018–19 season, Parks was employed as Head of Academy Goalkeeping at Watford. However, he left the club in September 2018 to set up "Tony Parks Goalkeeping" offering private coaching and Coach Education.

Career statistics

Honours

Club
Tottenham Hotspur;
UEFA Cup: 1983–84

Falkirk
Scottish Challenge Cup: 1993–94

References

External links
 
 
 

1963 births
Living people
Footballers from Hackney Central
English footballers
Association football goalkeepers
Tottenham Hotspur F.C. players
Oxford United F.C. players
Gillingham F.C. players
Brentford F.C. players
Queens Park Rangers F.C. players
Fulham F.C. players
West Ham United F.C. players
Stoke City F.C. players
Falkirk F.C. players
Blackpool F.C. players
Burnley F.C. players
Doncaster Rovers F.C. players
Barrow A.F.C. players
Scarborough F.C. players
Halifax Town A.F.C. players
English Football League players
Scottish Premier League players
Scottish Football League players
English football managers
Halifax Town A.F.C. managers
Tottenham Hotspur F.C. non-playing staff
Norwich City F.C. non-playing staff
Aston Villa F.C. non-playing staff
Watford F.C. non-playing staff
UEFA Cup winning players
Association football goalkeeping coaches